

The CAMS 31 was a 1920s French single-seat fighter biplane flying-boat designed and built by Chantiers Aéro-Maritimes de la Seine (CAMS).

Design and development
The CAMS 31 was a wooden-built two-bay equal span biplane with stabilising floats under each wing and an open cockpit forward of the lower-wing for the pilot. Powered by a Hispano-Suiza 8Fb inline piston engine driving a pusher propeller, the engine was strut mounted between the wings. The CAMS 31 was armed with two fixed hull-mounted Vickers machine-guns in the bow.

The CAMS 31 prototype, later designated the CAMS 31 Type 22, first flew in 1922. A second prototype, the CAMS 31 Type 23, flew in 1923 with a reduced-span wing and wider chord but still had the same wing area as the Type 22. Testing proved the flying-boats handled well but were just not suitable as fighters and no more were built.

A mail carrying postal variant was designated CAMS 31P

Variants
CAMS 31 Type 22
Original wing
CAMS 31 Type 23
Reduced span extended chord wing of same area
CAMS 31MProposed production fighter, not proceeded with.
CAMS 31P
Postal variant

Specifications (CAMS 31 Type 22)

See also

References

Notes

Bibliography

Flying boats
1920s French fighter aircraft
31
Single-engined pusher aircraft
Biplanes